Cole is an unincorporated community in Grant County, Indiana, in the United States.

History
The post office that Cole once contained was called Coleboro. The post office operated from 1900 until 1902.

References

Unincorporated communities in Grant County, Indiana
Unincorporated communities in Indiana